This is a list of singles which have reached number one on the Irish Singles Chart in 1972.  The chart issue date changed from Saturday to Friday effective in late June.

See also
1972 in music
Irish Singles Chart
List of artists who reached number one in Ireland

1972 in Irish music
1972 record charts
1972